Nasra Al Adawi is an Omani writer and poet.

Born in Zanzibar, Nasra started writing poems in Arabic before switching to English. She has published three books of poetry, which have helped create greater public awareness about cancer. She writes for the Omani women's magazine Al Mar'a.

Works
 Collective Thoughts, 2002.
 Within Myself: The Will Power To Live beyond Cancer, 2004
 Brave Faces: The Daring Stand Against Cancer. Muscat: man Printers, 2007.

See also 
 Khawla al-Zahiri
 Fatimah Muhammad Sha'ban
 Huda Hamed

References

Sources
 journals.squ.edu.om

Living people
Omani poets
Omani women writers
Omani journalists
Omani women poets
Omani women journalists
Zanzibari writers
Year of birth missing (living people)